The New York Giants were a Major League Baseball team that played in Manhattan, New York until moving to San Francisco in 1958.  From 1883 until their move to San Francisco, they played their home games at the Polo Grounds.  They played in the National League. The first game of the new baseball season for a team is played on Opening Day, and being named the Opening Day starter is an honor, which is often given to the player who is expected to lead the pitching staff that season, though there are various strategic reasons why a team's best pitcher might not start on Opening Day. The Giants used 33 different Opening Day starting pitchers in their 75 seasons they played in New York. The Giants won 39 of those games against 35 losses in those Opening Day starts.  They also played one tie game.

Carl Hubbell had the most Opening Day starts for the New York Giants with six between 1929 and 1942.  Mickey Welch, Amos Rusie and Larry Jansen each had five Opening Day starts for the team.  Christy Mathewson, Red Ames, Jeff Tesreau and Bill Voiselle all had four Opening Day starts apiece for the Giants.  Ed Doheny and Johnny Antonelli each had three Opening Day starts for the New York Giants and Antonelli also had an Opening Day start for the San Francisco Giants in 1959, giving him a total of four Opening Day starts for the franchise.  Antonelli is the only player to have an Opening Day start for both the New York and San Francisco Giants.

Other pitchers who had multiple Opening Day starts for the New York Giants were Hal Schumacher with three such starts, and Joe McGinnity, Rube Marquard, Jesse Barnes, Art Nehf, Virgil Barnes, Bill Walker and Sal Maglie with two apiece.  Seven Hall of Fame pitchers made Opening Day starts for the New York Giants — Welch, Tim Keefe, Rusie, Mathewson, McGinnity, Marquard and Hubbell.

Their Opening Day starting pitchers in those years were Joe McGinnity in 1905, Phil Douglas in 1921, Art Nehf in 1922, Carl Hubbell in 1933 and Sal Maglie in 1954. In , the Giants won the National League championship but no World Series was played. Christy Mathewson was the Giants' Opening Day starting pitcher that season. The Giants also won the 19th century World Series twice, in 1888 and 1889. Ledell Titcomb and Mickey Welch were the Giants Opening Day starting pitchers in 1888 and 1889, respectively.

Jesse and Virgil Barnes, who each made two Opening Day starts for the New York Giants, were brothers.

Key

Pitchers

References

Opening day starters
Lists of Major League Baseball Opening Day starting pitchers
New York Giants